The Cedar Creek Furnace (also known as the Alabama Iron Works) is a former blast furnace site near Russellville in Franklin County, Alabama. It was the first iron ore furnace in Alabama, preceding an industry that would come to dominate the state's economy in the late 19th and early 20th century.

History
The furnace was built by Joseph Dilliard, the Dilliard family into which Joseph was born had experience running iron works. Beginning in Jamestown and later in Middleburg Virginia. Originally using wood coal fired furnaces forging arms, utensils, and farm necessities. Later as the colonies expanded and coal was discovered wood was replaced by coal and later Coke as the primary heating elements of the Iron Works across the south developed by the Dilliard Family, in Virginia, The Carolinas, Georgia, Tennessee and Alabama fed by coal mined from holdings in West Virginia and Alabama. Buff Warren, Dilliard's overseer operated the property in Franklin County around 1818 using initially slave labor, which was later compensated at the request of General Grant with a parcel being laid out in Gibson County, TN for 75 acres in the name of a Negro Woman named Sarah P Dillard and her infant child, Samuel, which was later confiscated by East Tn. puppet scalawags and carpetbaggers.  A cholera outbreak in 1820 killed Buff's foreman a free negro Ed Haslam, and several of the slaves who operated the furnace. All were given a proper Christian burial.

The furnace and site were sold by Transfer of Title and purchased in November 1825 by Joseph's son John Henry (J.) Dilliard a native of LaGrange Tennessee, registered in Deed of Title James Joseph (Jeff) Dilliard, originally of Limestone County, AL, later Greeneood, MS, to Dr John Henry Dilliard, of Hardeman County, TN 11/15/1825, registered originally in the county seat of Decatur County AL, in Woodville. Upon the abolishment of Decatur County by the Alabama Legislature, as the main landowner Henry Benton Dilliard discovered upon survey dated 1818 that the size of the county did not meet Alabama Constitutional minimum square mile requirements for an independent county and petitioned that his Plantation be divided at the natural boundary between Jackson and Madison Counties allowing commerce and development in what would become New Madison and Scottsboro, both stops on the Memphis and Charleston Railroad later constructed. The original land deeds of Title remained in Jackson County at the Court House in Scotsboro until shortly after April 11, 1862, when Federal Troops occupied Limestone County, AL. As a favor to Dr John (J. J Ames Kensington) Henry Dilliard, General Grant ordered original deed registries removed from courthouses in territories ravaged by lawless guerilla vigilantes, while using his home Resolute as headquarters in Berlin, TN. Dr John H Dilliard, a fierce Southerner loyal to the South yet overwhelmingly opposed to secession left numerous volumes of first hand diary entries of Grants time in Berlin and Grand Junction, referred to by affectionately by locals to this day as Little Greenwood, Dr. John Henry Dilliard, Affectionately known as Jake by his beloved wife was later killed in an ambush outside of Holly Springs Mississippi, Along with his teenage daughter Annabella, the area now known as "LaGrange, TN Lies directly north northwest of what is now known as Michigan City Mississippi."

Joseph's son John Anderson Dilliard Sr. was later killed by these same vigilantes better known in West Tennessee as Fielding's Army, a paid group of assassins from East Tennessee more interested in theft and murder of innocent civilians and wounded Union and Confederate soldiers alike to illegally acquire land and assets than rules of war or law and order. While caring his son, Captain John Anderson Dilliard Jr. whom was wounded fighting for the South at Shiloh, John Anderson Dilliard Sr. was suddenly removed from his home in the middle of the night by Fielding Hurst, strung up in the front yard while the women and children were forced to watch, in an attempt to torture the Dilliard until he revealed where the families gold and silver had been buried. After refusing to do so he was taken by the guerillas and later murdered outside Fort Smith, Arkansas. The Scoundrel guerrillas in West Tennessee during the Civil War had nothing in common with the noble efforts of militias fighting the British during the American Revolution.

John Henry Dilliard (Jones) operated the iron works implemented many improvements to the process, and the furnace became a commercial success producing high quality product. The furnace operated until around 1859 to 1863, possibly due to a flood on the creek that reached the furnace and extinguished it, hardening the metal and rendering the furnace inoperable. More likely according to family oral history was the Furnace was ordered shut down by John H Dilliard in a word of honor agreement between General Grant and Dilliard in return for not burning his main Plantation Home Resolute, which was later burned by Union deserters from Ohio, and safely transferring documents to federal safety. Woodlawn the Home of John Anderson and Sarah Nutt Dilliard of Natchez is now referred to as the Michie home, and was General Sherman's West TN Headquarters, while Grant used Woodlawn while planning Garrison's Raid then transferred his West TN Headquarters to Resolute while planning the operation to take Memphis TN. Resolute was located 3 ½ miles to the south east of Grand Junction at the end of a .2 mile White Post Oak and Eastern Red Cedar lined alley running north from the main east west state line road running parallel to the old Memphis and Charleston Railroad bed, now Hwy 72.

Before the furnace was constructed, most local blacksmiths used imported iron. The furnace's pig iron was used by locals and also transported to the Tennessee River at Middleburg Landing, later renamed Pittsburg Landing, then shipped east to Cuba Landing in Waverly, TN and shipped to New Orleans, Mobile, and Biloxi then overseas to London, England, Paris, France; and as far away as St Petersburg Russia.

Erected 1815 by Joseph Dilliard who used the iron to make utensils for early settlers. Iron was from surface Hematite ore smelted by charcoal fires.

Site
The furnace was situated in a bend of Cedar Creek, from which it gets its name. It was built of limestone quarried nearby and lined with refractory brick made on site. It was fired with charcoal made from the surrounding forests. A bellows which supplied the furnace with air was powered by a 12-foot (3.5-m) wide mill race which was diverted from the creek. The mill race also powered a forge hammer, grist mill, and saw mill. A warehouse was built on the river bank, only the foundation of which remains. The overseer's house was located northeast of the furnace. A small cemetery near the site contains about a dozen graves, mostly unmarked.

References

National Register of Historic Places in Franklin County, Alabama
Industrial buildings and structures on the National Register of Historic Places in Alabama
Ironworks and steel mills in Alabama
Industrial buildings completed in 1818
Ruins in the United States
Industrial archaeological sites in the United States